The 2014 Penn Quakers football team represented the University of Pennsylvania in the 2014 NCAA Division I FCS football season. They were led by 23rd year head coach Al Bagnoli and played their home games at Franklin Field. They were a member of the Ivy League. They finished the season 2–8 overall 2–5 in Ivy League play to place sixth . Penn averaged 6,982 fans per game.

On April 22, head coach Bagnoli announced his intentions to retire at the end of the 2014 season. He finished at Penn with a 23-year record of 234–99. However, on February 23, Bagnoli accepted the head coaching position at Ivy League rival Columbia.

Schedule

References

Penn
Penn Quakers football seasons
Penn Quakers football